Red Rock West is a 1993 American neo-noir thriller film directed by John Dahl and starring Nicolas Cage, Lara Flynn Boyle, J. T. Walsh, and Dennis Hopper. It was written by Dahl and his brother Rick, and shot in Montana, Willcox, Arizona, Sonoita, Arizona and Elgin, Arizona.

Plot
Michael Williams is a drifter living out of his car after being discharged from the Marine Corps. A job on an oilfield falls through due to his unwillingness to conceal a war injury on his job application, so Michael wanders into rural Red Rock, Wyoming, looking for other work. A local bar owner named Wayne mistakes him for a hitman, "Lyle from Dallas", whom Wayne has hired to kill his wife. Wayne offers him a stack of cash—"half now, half later"—and Michael plays along by taking the money.

Michael visits Wayne's wife, Suzanne, and instead of killing her, he attempts to warn her that her life is in danger. She offers him more money to kill Wayne. Michael tries to leave town but a car accident leads him to encounter the local sheriff, who turns out to be Wayne. Michael manages to escape from Wayne but runs into the real Lyle from Dallas. Lyle and Wayne quickly figure out what has transpired, while Michael desperately tries to warn Suzanne before Lyle finds her.

The next morning, when Lyle comes to get money from Wayne, he kidnaps both Suzanne and Michael, who are trying to retrieve hidden cash from Wayne's office. Wayne and Suzanne are revealed to be wanted for embezzlement and Wayne is arrested by his own deputies. Lyle returns with Michael and Suzanne hostage and gets Wayne out of jail to retrieve their stash of money. At a remote graveyard, Wayne pulls a gun from the case of money and holds Lyle at gunpoint before Lyle throws a knife into Wayne's neck. Michael and Lyle fight, with Lyle ending up being impaled on a grave marker. When Lyle rises to attack Michael, Suzanne shoots him dead.

Michael and Suzanne get onto a nearby train, but when Suzanne tries to betray Michael, he throws much of the money out of the speeding train and then throws Suzanne off to be arrested by the police accompanied by a wounded Wayne. He remarks finally, "Adios, Red Rock". Michael has stored away some of the cash for himself and keeps riding the train into a new town.

Cast
 Nicolas Cage as Michael Williams
 Dennis Hopper as Lyle, From Dallas
 Lara Flynn Boyle as Ann McCord / Suzanne Brown
 J.T. Walsh as Kevin McCord / Sheriff Wayne Brown 
 Dwight Yoakam as Truck Driver
 Timothy Carhart as Deputy Matt Greytack
 Dan Shor as Deputy Bowman
 Robert Apel as Howard
 Craig Reay as Jim
 Dale Gibson as Kurt
 Shawn Michael Ryan as Ted
 Barbara Glover as Jane
 Vance Johnson as Mr. Johnson
 Robert Beecher as Caretaker 
 Jody Carter as Caretaker's Wife

Production
Red Rock West was filmed in 1992 in Arizona on a budget of $7 million. The domestic rights were sold to Columbia TriStar Home Video for $2.5 million and the foreign rights to Manifesto Films, a subsidiary of PolyGram Filmed Entertainment.

Release
Test screenings for the film were not strong and Peter Graves, an independent consultant who headed the marketing department at Polygram said, "The film doesn't fall neatly into any marketable category. A western film noir isn't something people can immediately spark to". One of the producers suggested early on that the film be submitted to the Sundance Film Festival and was told by the studio that it wasn't a festival film. sold Red Rock West to cable and it was shown seven times on HBO in the fall of 1993.

The film opened successfully in theaters in Germany, Paris, and London in the summer of 1993. Piers Handling, director of the Toronto International Film Festival saw the film in Paris and decided to show it at the festival in September. Bill Banning, who owned the Roxie Cinema and Roxie Releasing in San Francisco saw Red Rock West in Toronto and thought that there might be an American theatrical audience for the film. It took him until January 1994 to find out who owned the rights. The film had already played on HBO and was due to come out on video in February. Banning started showing Red Rock West at the Roxie Cinema on January 28, 1994, where it broke box office records before expanding to eight theaters in the city. It then opened in Los Angeles and New York City.

Reception
 

In his review for The Washington Post, Richard Harrington praised it as "a treasure waiting to be discovered". Writing in The New York Times, Caryn James called it "a terrifically enjoyable, smartly acted, over-the-top thriller". Roger Ebert praised it as "a diabolical movie that exists sneakily between a western and a thriller, between a film noir and a black comedy," and gave the film three-and-a-half stars out of four.

Year-end lists
 4th – Michael MacCambridge, Austin American-Statesman
 7th – Peter Travers, Rolling Stone
 9th – Gene Siskel, The Chicago Tribune
 10th – Peter Rainer, Los Angeles Times
 Honorable mention – William Arnold, Seattle Post-Intelligencer
 Honorable mention – David Elliott, The San Diego Union-Tribune

Music
The soundtrack for the film features a number of country music performers, including Johnny Cash, Shania Twain, Toby Keith, The Kentucky Headhunters, and Sammy Kershaw. Dwight Yoakam wrote the film's closing credits song "A Thousand Miles From Nowhere" when the film was being made and while the musician made his acting debut in the film. The song went on to become a Top 10 country hit.

References

External links

 
 
 
 
 Bright Lights Film Journal article

1993 films
1993 independent films
1993 thriller films
American independent films
American neo-noir films
American thriller films
Films directed by John Dahl
Films scored by William Olvis
Films set in Wyoming
Films shot in Arizona
Films shot in California
Films shot in Montana
Films produced by Steve Golin
Films with screenplays by John Dahl
PolyGram Filmed Entertainment films
1990s English-language films
1990s American films